Na(+)/H(+) exchange regulatory cofactor NHE-RF3 is a protein that in humans is encoded by the PDZK1 gene.

Interactions 

PDZK1 has been shown to interact with:
 AKAP10, 
 CLCN3, 
 Cystic fibrosis transmembrane conductance regulator 
 FARP2, 
 PDZK1IP1, 
 SLC22A12, 
 SLC22A4, 
 SLC34A3,
 SLK,  and
 Sodium-hydrogen antiporter 3 regulator 1.

Related gene problems
TAR syndrome
1q21.1 deletion syndrome
1q21.1 duplication syndrome

References

Further reading